St Francis De Sales Regional College is an independent Roman Catholic co-educational secondary day and boarding school, located in the Riverina town of Leeton, New South Wales, Australia. Founded in 1956 by the Marist Brothers, the College is one of three secondary schools serving Leeton, most enrolments come from Leeton, with students also drawn from around the region as a result of the school's boarding program. These include Griffith, Narrandera, Deniliquin, Coleambally and Hay. The school is situated on Yanco Avenue on the southern approach to Leeton.

Administration
Mrs. Brenda King was appointed as the first lay principal in 2004, and served until June 2015. Upon her departure, Mr. Sebastian Spina was appointed as acting principal until 2017 when he became principal, which he served until the end of 2022.

Significant events
On an irregular basis the school stages musical productions which are conducted by the music department and its directors and teachers. In 2002, at Leeton's Roxy Theatre, St. Francis staged Oliver! with an extensive cast and crew. In 2005 they premiered the production of Buralga which was written by the school's music teacher and director, Mark Ciavarella. Production was undertaken by former student, Paul Marin, and his production company using several kilometres of cable and hundreds of thousands of dollars worth of professional equipment including moving lights, smoke machines, flying rigs and other stage equipment. It was filmed and a limited number of DVDs were produced, most going to the cast and crew. The school also holds an annual performing and visual arts showcase which exhibits the school's music, drama, visual arts, photography and digital media disciplines, as well as the hospitality department, which provides canapés for the intermission break.

Learning areas
The school's learning areas include: 
English 
Mathematics
Science
HSIE (Human Society and It's Environments)
Creative Arts, including:
Drama
Music
Art
PDHPE (Physical Development/Health/Physical Education)
TAS (Technology and Applied Studies), including:
Food Technology
Textiles
Multimedia
Graphics Technology
VET (Vocational Education and Training), including:
Hospitality
Construction
Industrial Metals
Industrial Timber
Religion

Notable former students
Jacob Townsend- AFL Footballer
Jacob Hopper- AFL Footballer 
David Trotter- AFL Footballer, player agent
Matt Flynn (Australian footballer)

See also 

 List of Catholic schools in New South Wales
 List of boarding schools in Australia
 List of schools in the Riverina
 Catholic education in Australia

References

Boarding schools in New South Wales
Leeton, New South Wales
Catholic secondary schools in New South Wales
Educational institutions established in 1956
1956 establishments in Australia
Catholic boarding schools in Australia
Roman Catholic Diocese of Wagga Wagga
Education in the Riverina